The Arouquesa is a cattle breed from Portugal. The Arouquesa breed was granted protected geographical status of DOC (Denominação de Origem Controlada) from the European Commission

Description
Their hair colour is light brown although the males may become a little darker than females. Mucosa and claws are dark coloured. The wide horns are directed forward, first down and then up.

Characteristics
Arouquesas are adapted to the mountains - their hind legs are very muscular. In Portugal today they still work as draught cattle. In the past century oxen often were exported to Great Britain because of their beef. In 1902 Arouquesa beef was the winner of the "Award for the Best Beef" in Paris. Unfortunately this excellent, fine marbled beef today is only known in Portugal. There they count as the best native breed for beef production. The animals are very long-living; 16–18 calves per cow are not uncommon. Most times they practice mother cow husbandry. The animals are very affable but active.

Extension
The breed region is circumscribed almost exclusively to the Northern Portuguese districts of Viseu, Aveiro, Porto, and Braga.

References

External links
 http://www.ancra.pt

Beef cattle breeds
Cattle breeds originating in Portugal
Portuguese products with protected designation of origin